Lambda Delta Sigma may refer to:

 Lambda Delta Sigma (Concordia), a sorority at Concordia College in Moorhead, Minnesota; founded in 1919
 Lambda Delta Sigma (LDS Church), a sorority for members of The Church of Jesus Christ of Latter-day Saints (LDS Church)

See also
 Sigma Gamma Chi, an LDS Church fraternity founded in 1936 as Lambda Delta Sigma that spun off the LDS sorority of the same name